Events from the year 1657 in Denmark.

Incumbents 

 Monarch - Frederick III
 Steward of the Realm – Joachim Gersdorff

Events 
 14 August – The first execution at Nytorv in Copenhagen takes place.

Births 
 1 December  Karen Brahe, book collector (born 1736)

Full date unknown 
 Hans Nobel, landowner and civil servant (died 1732)

Deaths 
 13 February – Erik Juel, noble Privy Councillor (born 1591) 
 29 April – Sophie Elisabeth Pentz, countess (born 1619)

References 

 
Denmark
Years of the 17th century in Denmark